Millingen (bei Rees) railway station on the Arnhem-Oberhausen railway
 Millingen (bei Rheinberg) railway station on the Xanten - Duisburg railway